The 1972 Wightman Cup was the 44th edition of the annual women's team tennis competition between the United States and Great Britain. It was held at the All England Lawn Tennis and Croquet Club in London in England in the United Kingdom. A women's tennis pioneer, Edythe Ann (Sullivan) McGoldrick, led the U.S. Wightman Cup tennis team as captain in the cup's 50th year.

References

1972
1972 in women's tennis
1972 in American tennis
1972 in English women's sport
1972 sports events in London
1972 in English tennis